Matic Paljk (born 2 October 1997) is a Slovenian professional footballer who plays as a left-back for Primorje.

Club career
Paljk started his youth career in Slovenia with Izola, before joining Koper in 2010. In 2015, Paljk joined Italian team Spezia on loan. He only featured for the club's U19s before returning to Koper. On 17 July 2016, he made his professional debut in the Slovenian PrvaLiga against Maribor, playing the first half in a 1–0 defeat. He went onto play sixteen times for Koper throughout the 2016–17 season and scored one goal, against Olimpija Ljubljana in March 2017. He departed Koper in the following summer after the club suffered relegation to the Slovenian Intercommunal Leagues.

In October 2017, Paljk joined Premier League side Swansea City on a free transfer. He signed a contract until June 2018 and immediately linked up with the Swansea U23s. He was released at the conclusion of the 2017–18 season.

In January 2019, Paljk returned to Slovenia's PrvaLiga after signing with Olimpija Ljubljana. After no competitive appearances for them, a loan move to the Second League with Gorica was completed in July 2019. Thirteen appearances followed, including his debut at home to ex-club Koper, as they won promotion to the top-flight via the play-offs. Paljk was signed permanently by Gorica in September 2020. His first game as a full-time member came in a defeat away to Olimpija Ljubljana on 30 September.

International career
Paljk has represented Slovenia at U18 and U21 level. He won four caps for the U18s, prior to making three appearances for the U21s in 2017. Paljk received a call-up to the U19s in November 2015.

Career statistics

References

External links

1997 births
Living people
Sportspeople from Koper
Slovenian footballers
Slovenia youth international footballers
Slovenia under-21 international footballers
Association football fullbacks
Slovenian expatriate footballers
Expatriate footballers in Italy
Expatriate footballers in England
Slovenian expatriate sportspeople in Italy
Slovenian expatriate sportspeople in England
Slovenian PrvaLiga players
Slovenian Second League players
FC Koper players
Swansea City A.F.C. players
NK Olimpija Ljubljana (2005) players
ND Gorica players